Blackjack Mountain is  long mountain ridge trending from northeast to southwest in Pushmataha County, Oklahoma. It is one of several such ridges in the Ouachita Mountains range. The town of Rattan, Oklahoma is south of Blackjack Mountain.

Etymology

The etymology of the name is unclear. It is reasonable to believe that the mountain was named for the species of tree named Blackjack Oak (a.k.a. Quercus marilandica). The tree is indigenous to the area of the United States that extends from Maryland to Florida along the Atlantic coast to east Texas and eastern Oklahoma. It would have been very familiar to the Choctaws in both their new and old homelands.

History
Blackjack Mountain is most notable as the place where mustangs have roamed freely for many years. Many writers have claimed that these horses are descended from those left behind by Spanish conquistadores who traveled in this part of North America during the early 1500s. This area became part of the vast Louisiana Purchase that the United States government acquired from France in 1803. By the 1830s, the immigration of millions of Europeans had created almost constant conflict with the Native American tribes that had long lived in the Southeastern states. The government, especially under the administration of President Andrew Jackson, adopted a policy called "Indian Removal," decided to resettle the natives to seemingly uninhabited land, then called "Indian Territory," west of the Mississippi River. One of these tribes, the Choctaw was granted a large part of the territory bounded on the east by Arkansas Territory, on the south by the Red River of the South and on the west by the 100th parallel. The U.S. Army forced the Choctaws to leave their former homelands and move to their new area in 1831. Thus, Blackjack Mountain and its mustangs became the property of the Choctaw Nation.

The original Spanish horses began breeding with other horses almost as soon as they congregated on the mountain. This led to changes in their gene pool. By the mid 19th Century, they became known collectively as "Choctaw ponies."

See also
Spanish Mustang
History of Pushmataha County, Oklahoma

Notes

References

Landforms of Pushmataha County, Oklahoma
Ridges of Oklahoma
Ouachita Mountains